The Paul F. Murphy House is a house located in northwest Portland, Oregon, listed on the National Register of Historic Places.

See also
 National Register of Historic Places listings in Northwest Portland, Oregon

References

Houses on the National Register of Historic Places in Portland, Oregon
Houses completed in 1934
1934 establishments in Oregon
Hillside, Portland, Oregon
Portland Historic Landmarks